A non-property system is the name of an economic system appearing in the futuristic fictional books and short stories by Iain Banks called the Culture series, in which there is no concept of property. No individual or group is given superior rights to control any particular resource. The system is maintained by agreement within the society to encourage normative behaviors governing resource creation and distribution, conflict resolution, and support and protection of the elderly, infirm, and children. Within this system, there is no incentive to own resources aside from personal possessions because owning resources would serve no social function and cannot be sold for money in a market.

The non-property system, while being incompatible with capitalism which is dependent on the idea of property to function, is unlike socialist and communist systems, where there is group ownership by state entities or cooperative enterprises. It is also different from a barter system, where property rights are central to the idea behind barter and exchange. Under the non-property system, there is no property at all; this is most similar to anarchism without adjectives, since property can only be maintained in systems where a hierarchy of power still remains (the very disparity between the owner of something and someone who doesn't own that something is itself a hierarchical relationship).

Within the division of economic systems from hands-on (coordinated and state controlled) to hands-off (autonomous enterprises), this system has characteristics that appear on both ends of the spectrum. Without property, the ideal of individual freedom is paramount, but coupled with traditions of compassion. The Non-property system also has the distinct characteristic of complete autonomy of society members to form voluntary groups and determine what gets produced.

An 'open-source heuristic' mechanism for a non-property system has been proposed to allow logistical production proposals with abundance as the goal. New AI technology with the omniverse can determine feasibility based on current resource dynamics; including volunteers. It can even make suggestions for obtaining the sufficient data for further evaluation.

See also
 Post-scarcity economy

Economic systems
Property